Okka Ammayi Thappa is a 2016 Indian Telugu-language action thriller film directed by Rajasimha Tadinada. Produced by Anji Reddy. It features Sundeep Kishan and Nithya Menen in the lead roles as the main protagonists along with Ravi Kishan in a pivotal role as the main antagonist. Produced by Anji Reddy with music composed by Mickey J Meyer.

The film was dubbed into Hindi as Asli Fighter in 2018.

Cast
 Sundeep Kishan as Krishna Vachan
 Nithya Menen as Mango/ Satyabhama 
 Ravi Kishan as Anwar
 Rahul Dev as Aslam Bhai
 Ali
 Prudhviraj
 Ajay as  Krishna's elder brother 
 Brahmaji as Police Officer 
 Saptagiri
 Thagubothu Ramesh
 Rohini
 Nalini

Production 
The film's first look was released on 15 April 2016. The music was released on 8 May 2016. The audio launch was held in Hyderabad.

Soundtrack
The soundtrack comprises 5 songs composed by  Mickey J. Meyer. Aditya Music acquired its marketing rights.

Release
The film was released on 10 June 2016 across Telangana and Andhra Pradesh.

Reception 
A critic from The Times of India wrote that "The script is nine years old, so is the execution. A concept which had so much to offer falls flat under distracted direction". A critic from The Hindu opined that "within 30 minutes into the film you are left wondering what’s happening on screen. At regular intervals, annoying characters pop up".

Box office
Okka Ammayi Thappa grossed ₹1.3 crore on opening day at AP/Telangana boxoffice.

References

External links
 
 

2010s Telugu-language films
2016 films
Films scored by Mickey J Meyer
Indian romantic thriller films
2010s romantic thriller films